The Showbread Institute (in Hebrew - Machon Lechem Hapanim מכון לחם הפנים) is a research institute dedicated to researching the biblical Showbread (also called Shewbread, Face Bread.).

Founded in 2018 and located in Karnei Shomron, Israel, the Showbread Institute is run by Eliezer Meir (Les) Saidel, a Temple researcher and master baker.

Using multiple modern scientific disciplines, coupled with an in-depth study of scripture and commentaries, the ShowBread Institute is attempting to reconstruct the biblical Showbread and uncover its secrets and hidden symbolism.

Media Appearances
1. 

2. 

3. 

4. 

5. 

6. 

7. 

8. 

9. 

10. 

11. 

12.

External links

Notes

.

Biblical studies organizations
Research institutes in Israel
2018 establishments in Israel
Education in the West Bank